North Korea–Russia relations are the bilateral relations between Russia and North Korea.  The Soviet Union (Union of Soviet Socialist Republics, USSR, the predecessor state to the Russian Federation) was the first to recognize North Korea (Democratic People's Republic of Korea, DPRK) on October 12, 1948, shortly after the proclamation, as the sole legitimate authority in all of Korea (China was the first country to recognize the Republic of Korea in a divided nation). During the Korean War, the Korean People's Army was supported by the Soviet Armed Forces. North Korea was founded as part of the Communist bloc, and received major Soviet military and political support. The comprehensive personality cult around North Korea's ruling family was heavily influenced by Stalinism. China and the Soviet Union competed for influence in North Korea during the Sino-Soviet split in the 1960s, as North Korea tried to maintain good relations with both countries.

Relations between the two countries continued after the dissolution of the Soviet Union. The relationship regained importance after Vladimir Putin was elected President of Russia in 2000. Kim Jong-un also accepted an invitation to visit Russia in mid-2015.

In 2022, North Korea became the third country (the second being Syria) to recognise the independence of the breakaway states of Donetsk and Luhansk People's Republics in Eastern Ukraine. In response to the recognition, Ukraine terminated diplomatic ties with North Korea. In August 2022, North Korea volunteered 100,000 of their own troops to help Donbas. In September 2022, Russia reportedly purchased millions of shells and rockets from North Korea to aid in its invasion of Ukraine.

Favorable perceptions of North Korea in Russia have gradually declined in recent years, with only 34% of Russians viewing North Korea as a friendly nation and 60% of Russians believing that North Korea's nuclear arms pose a threat to other countries; only 8% of Russians favor supporting North Korea in a potential conflict. According to a 2014 BBC World Service Poll, 19% of Russians view North Korea's influence positively, with 37% expressing a negative view.

History

Soviet Union (USSR) & Cold war

The Soviet Union had provided much support to North Korea during the Cold War.

Soviet troops invaded the Japanese colony of Korea in 1945; by agreement with the U.S., the 38th parallel was the dividing line with Moscow in charge to the north and Washington to the South.

North Korea came under the control of the Soviet Civil Administration and People's Committee of North Korea from 1945 to 1948.

The Soviet 64th Fighter Aviation Corps took part in the Korean War where they provided North Korea and China with badly needed pilots.

Moscow under Mikhail Gorbachev began to reduce aid to the North after 1985 in favor of reconciliation with South Korea. Military equipment continued to be provided until a last batch of MiG-29s was delivered in 1989. Kim Il-sung visited the USSR five times, with the last time being in 1986 during the early Gorbachev era. He also met with Soviet officials abroad, including with Soviet leader Leonid Brezhnev during the funeral of Yugoslav President Josip Broz Tito in May 1980.

Russian Federation (RF)

1990s

After the dissolution of the USSR, the new Russian government under Boris Yeltsin refused to provide support for North Korea, favoring South Korea instead.

The first meeting of the Inter-governmental Commission for Trade, Economic, and Scientific-Technical Cooperation between Russia and DPRK was held in the spring of 1996 led by Deputy Premier Vitali Ignatenko. This was the highest- level meeting (at the deputy prime ministerial level) between Moscow and Pyongyang since the collapse of the Soviet Union. During the visit, the two countries agreed to restore bilateral trade and economic cooperation to its 1991 level. The two sides also agreed to restore bilateral inter-governmental commissions and to establish working-level bodies between North Korea and the Russian Far Eastern province for bilateral cooperation in science-technology, forestry, light industry, and transport. Ignatenko carried Yeltsin's personal message to Kim Jong-il. In the message, Yeltsin expressed his hopes for tension reduction on the Korean peninsula and North Korea's continuing observance of the Armistice Agreement. Kim Jong-il, expecting that Zyuganov, the Communist Party leader, would win the coming presidential election in June–July 1996, did not even send a letter of reply, nor did he meet with the Russian delegation.

2000s

Vladimir Putin's elevation to prime minister in August 1999 and then president in March had critical significance for Pyongyang, which attributed its previous grievances to Yeltsin's government. Kim Jong-il's references to Putin were to the effect that at last Russia had a leader "with whom to do business." However, intensive diplomatic work had to precede a historical breakthrough in Russia–DPRK relations. These efforts began to bear fruit in late 1998, and by March 1999, it became possible to agree completely on the text and the initial Treaty on Friendship, Good-Neighborly Relations and Cooperation. It was signed in February 2000, after Yeltsin left the political arena.

Starting in April 2000, covert preparations for a visit by President Putin to Pyongyang began. The first summit meeting in the history of Russian-Korean relations took place in July 2000 when a Joint Declaration was signed, the first international document signed by Kim Jong-il as leader of the DPRK.

In April 2002, a delegation from the DPRK's Main Department for Atomic Energy, headed by its Chief Lee Choi Saeng, visited Moscow, as well as a delegation from the Academy of Sciences, headed by its Vice-president Kang Dong Kyun, who afterwards visited Novosibirsk.

In 2006 Russia supported United Nations Security Council Resolution 1695 in July, condemning the 2006 North Korean missile test.

In April 2009 Russian Foreign Minister Sergey Lavrov visited North Korea and signed a plan with Mun Jae-chol, acting chairman of the Korean Committee for Cultural Relations with Foreign Countries on 2009–2010 of cultural and scientific exchange.

After the North Korean nuclear test on 25 May 2009, North Korea's relations with China and Russia changed. Russia, fearing that North Korea's success could lead to a nuclear war, joined China, France, Japan, South Korea, United Kingdom and the United States in starting a resolution that could include new sanctions. The Russian news agencies were outraged when North Korea threatened to attack neighboring South Korea after it joined a U.S. led plan to check vessels suspected of carrying equipment for weapons of mass destruction. Another concern was that the nuclear test can be a threat to the security of Russia's far east regions which border North Korea. South Korean president Lee Myung-bak had a phone conversation with Russian president Dmitry Medvedev, where Medvedev told him that Russia would work with Seoul on a new U.N. Security Council resolution and to revive international talks on the North Korean nuclear issue.

On 15 June 2009, China and Russia supported the UN sanctions on North Korea. However, the two countries stressed that they did not support the use of force. Permanent Representative of Russia to the United Nations Vitaly Churkin insisted that any sanctions should be lifted once North Korea cooperates. Also, On 30 March 2010, President Dmitry Medvedev signed a decree implementing intensified United Nations Security Council sanctions against Pyongyang's nuclear programs. The presidential decree banned the purchase of weapons and relevant materials from the DPRK by government offices, enterprises, banks, organizations and individuals currently under Russia's jurisdiction. It also prohibited the transit of weapons and relevant materials via Russian territory or their export to the DPRK. Any financial aid and educational training that might facilitate North Korea's nuclear program and proliferation activities were also forbidden.

2010s

In December 2010 the North Korean Minister of Foreign Affairs visited Moscow to meet his Russian counterpart, Lavrov, in what was seen as North Korea trying to control criticism about its attack on South Korea's Yeonpyeong island. Lavrov told the North Korean official that Pyongyang's November 23 artillery strike on Yeonpyeong island "resulted in loss of life" and "deserves condemnation".

On October 18, 2011, Russian and North Korean officials marked the 63rd anniversary of the establishment of bilateral diplomatic ties in an event at the North Korean embassy in Moscow. The evening's event was attended by Russian Deputy Foreign Minister Alexei Borodavkin.

A delegation of Russia's Federal Air Transport Agency (Rosaviatsia) visited Pyongyang from December 12 to 14, 2011. On December 13 (Tuesday) Rosaviatsia director Neradiko Alexandr and Kang Ki-sop, director of General Bureau of Civil Aviation signed an agreement on civilian search and rescue between Russia and the North Korea.

Following the North Korean announcement that it agreed to introduce a moratorium on nuclear tests, long-range missile launches and uranium enrichment, Russia's foreign ministry said, "We welcome North Korea's decision to impose a moratorium on testing nuclear weapons and launching long-range ballistic missiles, and enriching uranium".

After Putin won the 2012 Russian presidential election, Kim Jong-un congratulated him, writing in a letter "I wish you achievement in your responsible work for building a powerful Russia", expressing belief that the traditional bilateral relations of friendship and cooperation would grow stronger.

In May 2012 Russia appointed Alexandr Timonin as the new ambassador to North Korea. The latter presented his credentials to Kim Yong-nam at the Mansudae Assembly Hall. On June 27, 2012, during the visit of the Deputy Foreign Minister of the DPRK Kung Seok-ung to Moscow, Foreign Ministries of both countries have signed an inter-ministerial plan of exchanges on 2013–2014. On June 5, 2012, the two sides concluded a Boundary Treaty between the two states.

In September 2012 Russia agreed to write off 90% of North Korea's $11 billion historic debt to Russia as a sign of closer engagement with North Korea's new leader. The $1 billion North Korea has to repay will be used to finance Russian investment in humanitarian and energy projects in North Korea. This agreement removed legal blocks hindering the financing of trade between the two countries. In 2013, Russia supported both resolutions of the UN Security Council against North Korea for its missile and nuclear tests.

In February 2014, during the 2014 Winter Olympics in Sochi, Krasnodar Krai, a delegation headed by Kim Yong-nam travelled to represent North Korea, even though the latter did not participate in these Olympics. Kim had a meeting with President Putin, and also met a number of Russian parliamentarians and state officials in Moscow en route to the Games in Sochi. These included Valentina Matvienko and Ilyas Umakhanov of the Russian Federation Council, Mikhail Margelov, the chair of the International Affairs Committee of the same body, and Vice Foreign Minister Igor Morgulov. Korean Central Television (KCTV) also introduced the opening ceremony of the Sochi Winter Olympics on the day it took place, the 8th, focusing on the presence of Kim Yong-nam.

In October 2014, the new North Korean Foreign Minister, Ri Su-yong, made a ten-day visit to Russia.

In November 2014 North Korean leader Kim Jong-un's special envoy, Choe Ryong-hae, made a seven-day visit to Russia. During his trip, he met with Russian President Vladimir Putin, delivering a letter to him from Kim Jong-un, and with Russian Foreign Minister Sergey Lavrov.

In April 2019, Kim travelled by armored train to Vladivostok to meet Putin.

2020s
In February 2022, Russia launched an invasion of Ukraine. On 2 March, North Korea was one of the five countries to vote against a United Nations resolution condemning the invasion.

Following the footsteps of Russia, North Korea became the third country (the second being Syria) to recognise the independence of the breakaway states of Donetsk and Luhansk People's Republics in Eastern Ukraine. In response to the recognition, Ukraine terminated diplomatic ties with North Korea. In August, the New York Post reported that North Korea had offered 100,000 troops to help Donbas, but the Russian foreign ministry said this speculation was "completely fake".

In September, the New York Post reported that Russia had purchased millions of shells and rockets from North Korea to support its invasion, citing U.S. intelligence officials, but Russia and North Korea both deny this.

Russian Deputy Prime Minister Marat Khusnullin said they were "working on political arrangements" to employ North Korean workers in Russia, possibly 20,000 to 50,000 to develop the infrastructure in the Russian Far East.

More recently, North Korea appears to be trying to manufacture an artificial hegemonic conflict between the US and Russia. Russia's invasion of Ukraine is sparking outrage from Western nations, which has caused varying multilateral alliances to be created on both sides of the spectrum. The modern cold war is an opportunistic chance for North Korea to receive the military and financial support they received during the Soviet Union's existence. For example, the Soviet Union was directly involved in providing economic assistance to Kim Il Sung's undeveloped state, refining their ability to wage war with South Korea. Thus, North Korea's strategic value to China and Russia could be strengthened during cold war hostilities. It is also believed that Kim's regime senses a worsening relationship between Washington and Beijing as a window to test his weaponry as attention is turned elsewhere. According to Lee Seong-Hyon, a North-Korean expert at the Bush Foundation, the DPRK has “ [been] shooting whatever it wanted to shoot; it has been testing whatever it wanted to test.” In contrast, South Korea and the United States have been limited in how they can respond. Additionally, there has been growing evidence that North Korea has been providing weaponry to Russia amid the Ukraine War. Attempting to keep it under cover, sources have stated that the DPRK has directed weaponry to Russia through North Africa and the Middle East. Ned Price, the state Department spokesperson, would respond by imposing “every tool” through actions such as sanctions to punish North Korea. This comes at a time when China and Russia have previously vetoed proposed sanctions toward North Korea following their use of missile tests. Price has also encouraged other countries that have a diplomatic relationship with North Korea not to provide weaponry to Russia. Even if there is no direct evidence of Kim Jung Un supplying Putin's military with missiles, there is a similar ideology present in both countries. During the Ukraine war, Putin has shown the adoption of the North Korean foreign policy initiative of “Brinkmanship” with near-constant threats of nuclear conflict. The reliability of these threats is still debated, although it has made Western nations more hesitant about their involvement in the conflict. The diaspora of ideas between Russia and North Korea is the most concerning aspect, as both governments may start to coordinate their international agendas.

Economic relations
After the Korean War, the Soviet Union emerged as the main trading partner and sponsor of North Korea. Ninety-three North Korean factories were built with Russian technical assistance, forging the country's heavy-industrial backbone. Soviet aid to the DPRK indeed expanded from 1965 to 1968, especially after Sino-North Korean relations soured during the Chinese Cultural Revolution.

In 1988, at the peak of the bilateral relationship, about 60% of North Korea's trade was with the Soviet Union. Much of the trade was in raw materials and petroleum that Moscow provided to Pyongyang at concessional prices.

In response to the famine-stricken North Korea in the mid-1990s, Russia delivered humanitarian aid to North Korea twice in 1997: food and medicine worth 4.5 billion "old" rubles in the fall, and 370 tonnes of sugar, canned meat, fish and milk worth 3.5 billion rubles, in December.

In 2008, Russia delivered oil and food to North Korea in accordance with its obligations outlined at the six-party talks.

In August 2011, ahead of Kim Jong-il's visit to Russia, the Kremlin said that it was providing food assistance including some 50,000 tons of wheat. A few days after Kim's visit the presidential envoy to Russia's Far East, Viktor Ishayev, said wheat deliveries would begin via the town border of Khasan in September.

A week later a Russian economic delegation, led by Minister of Regional Development Viktor Basargin, was in North Korea to sign "a protocol of the 5th Meeting of the North Korea-Russia Intergovernmental Committee for Cooperation in Trade, Economy, Science and Technology". Also on same day, the North Korean premier, Choe Yong-rim, met with the Russian economic delegation at the Mansudae Assembly Hall in Pyongyang.

On 2 February 2012, the Interfax report further quoted the Russian ambassador to North Korea, Valery Sukhinin, as saying that Russia "did not rule out" the possibility of sending more humanitarian aid to North Korea, "depending on the situation there and taking into account our capabilities". Sukhinin went on to say that in 2011 Russia had provided North Korea with 50,000 tonnes of grain on a bilateral basis, as well as with $5 million worth of flour as part of the World Food Programme. In addition, 10,000 tonnes of grain were dispatched to North Korea by Gazprom.

However, of the overall bilateral economic trade between Russia and North Korea, 80% consists of cooperation and investment between North Korean and Russian regional areas. The most active regions are Siberia and the Far East, mainly the Kemerovo, Magadan and Primorski regions.

In December 2013 Russia joined the sanctions against North Korea, introduced in March by the UN Security Council (Resolution 2087). The corresponding decree signed by President Putin specified that Russian companies were prohibited to provide North Korea any technical assistance and advice in the development and production of ballistic missiles. In addition, North Korean naval vessels to call at Russian ports would be required to undergo inspection. Also, the authorities ordered to be vigilant when dealing with North Korean diplomats.

In June 2014 Russia and North Korea have agreed to settlements in rubles in all trade between the two countries. The first transactions in rubles between Russia and North Korea were carried out in October 2014.

In March 2015, a Russian official said Moscow and Pyongyang have agreed to discuss the creation of advanced development zones (:ru:территория опережающего развития) in Russia's Far East and North Korea.

In May 2016 the Central Bank of Russia ordered all Russian banks to halt financial dealings with North Korean agencies, organizations and individuals on the UN Security Council sanctions list. The move was in line with the United Nations Security Council resolution adopted in early March to penalize North Korea for its fourth nuclear test and long-range missile launch and curb its weapons of mass destruction program.

Debt
On 18 September 2012, North Korea and Russia signed a deal on debt owed by Pyongyang to Moscow. It is estimated that North Korea owed about $11 billion. North Korea's debt was established during the existence of the Soviet Union when the Soviets made loans to North Korea. The negotiations concerning debt reduction were held earlier in 2012, while the deal was signed in Moscow.

In 2011, it was reported that Russia would write off 90% of the North Korean debt and in return Russia would be allowed to invest in North Korean projects in the energy, health and education sectors, as reported in 2012. One of the major projects planned by Russia was to build a gas pipeline to energy-hungry South Korea through North Korea. The multi-billion-dollar project is, however, unlikely to be realized as North and South Korea are still de jure at war.

On 5 May 2014, Russian President Vladimir Putin ratified an agreement to write off 90% of North Korea's debts after the State Duma passed the law on 18 April 2014 and the Federation Council approved it on 29 April 2014.

Military relations
On April 26–28, 2001, North Korean Defense Minister Vice-Marshal Kim Il-chol visited Moscow, and a deal on bilateral cooperation in the defense industry and military equipment was signed between him and Deputy Prime Minister Ilya Klebanov. During Kim's visit, the two governments also signed a so-called "framework of intergovernmental agreement on cooperation in the military industry" and a deal between the two defense ministries.

In October 2002, a delegation from the DPRK's Ministry of People's Military, headed by the Deputy Chief of the Ministry of People's Military Lee Men-su, visited Russia. At the beginning of November that year a delegation from the Korean People's Air Force, headed by its commander Oh Kum-chul, visited Russia.

In November 2015, the head of the Russian delegation to Pyongyang, Colonel General Nikolay Bogdanovsky, and the Vice Chief of the Korean People's Army O Kum-chol signed an agreement on preventing dangerous military activities.

In September 2022, US intelligence said that Russia was buying millions of artillery shells and rockets from North Korea due to the sanctions caused by Russia's invasion of Ukraine.

In December 2022, a senior US official said he can "confirm" that Russia's Wagner Group  have took delivery of an arms shipment from North Korea to help bolster Russian forces in Ukraine.

The nuclear issue

In March 1994 during the first North Korean nuclear crisis, Russia, emphasizing its position as a member of Northeast Asia, proposed the eight-party talks, which included participants from North and South Korea, Russia, the U.S., China, Japan, the IAEA and the UN Secretary General.

From 2003 onward both states participated in the Six-party talks.

In October 2006 Russia supported United Nations Security Council Resolution 1718 condemning North Korea's nuclear test.

After North Korea detonated another nuclear weapon on 25 May 2009 the Russian Foreign Ministry issued a sharp note of condemnation; The statement called the test a "violation" of previous Security Council resolutions and a "serious blow" to the nuclear nonproliferation regime. It also complained that "the latest DPRK moves are provoking an escalation of tension in Northeast Asia."

North Korea under the third-generation leader Kim Jong-Un continues to defy the international community in relation to its nuclear and rocket programme. It has recently advised foreign embassies that the North Korean government could not guarantee their safety in an event of conflict and advised the foreign embassies to reconsider their evacuation plans.

In March 2016, following the January 2016 North Korean nuclear test, Russia supported a U.N. Security Council resolution regarding the introduction of further sanctions against North Korea. Russian presidential press secretary Dmitry Peskov said "the Kremlin is concerned over North Korea's statements about its readiness to use nuclear forces and urges all states to display restraint", in response to Kim Jong-un's orders to the military to deploy the nuclear warheads so they can be fired at "any moment" and be prepared to launch preemptive attacks against its enemies.

Border

The border area is mostly plain, with few mountains. An important natural landmark is Lake Khasan, which was the location of the Battle of Lake Khasan. Other landmarks include Zaozyornaya Hill (Russian: сопка Заозёрная), and Gora Priozernaya (Russian: Гора Приозерная). On the Russian side stands a building called "Korean-Russian House of Friendship" (Russian: Дом корейско-российской дружбы). Furugelm Island, the southernmost point in Asian Russia, is located close to the maritime border.

See also
 Foreign relations of Russia
 Foreign relations of North Korea
 Kim–Putin meetings
 Russia-South Korea relations
 North Korea–Russia border

References

Further reading
 Rozman, Gilbert. "North Korea’s place in Sino-Russian relations and identities." in International Relations and Asia’s Northern Tier (Palgrave, Singapore, 2018) pp. 301–314.

External links

Russia secretly offered North Korea nuclear technology, by a Special Correspondent in Pyongyang and Michael Hirst, 08/07/2006
Kim Jong-il's Train Kommersant, June 24, 2006
North Korea in Russian policy
 "Soviet Union-North Korea Relations," Wilson Center Digital Archive.
 64th Fighter Air Corps in Korea

 
Bilateral relations of Russia
Russia
North